Mario Cecchi Gori (21 March 1920, in Florence – 5 November 1993, in Rome) was an Italian film producer and owner of companies. He produced over 200 films, notably with Damiano Damiani, Dino Risi (The Easy Life, I Mostri) and Ettore Scola.

Gabriele Salvatores' film Mediterraneo won the Academy Award for Best Foreign Film.

With Lamerica, directed by Gianni Amelio, he received the Best Film Award at European Film Awards in 1994.

Il Postino: The Postman (1995, directed by Michael Radford) was the first Italian film to receive an Academy Award nomination for Best Film.

From 1990 to his death, he was the president of Fiorentina.

His son Vittorio Cecchi Gori is also a film producer.

Selected filmography
 Vacation with a Gangster (1951)

References

External links 
 .

Italian film producers
1920 births
1993 deaths
Italian football chairmen and investors
People from Brescia
David di Donatello winners
Nastro d'Argento winners
Filmmakers who won the Best Foreign Language Film BAFTA Award